Second Men's Regional League is the men's regional basketball league in Serbia. It is the 4th-tier of the basketball league system in Serbia. Founded in 2006, it is run by the Basketball Federation of Serbia (KSS).

Rules

Competition format
The league, operated by the Basketball Federation of Serbia and Regional Basketball Associations, consists of six divisions, North (N), North (S), Central, East, West (Group One) and West (Group Two), which have 14 teams each. The first team in every division will be promoted to First Men's Regional League in line with the regional format.

History
The following are the division champions of the Second Regional League:

Current clubs 
The following is the list of clubs for the 2021–22 season.

North (N)  
The North (North) division is composed of 17 clubs.

North (S) 
The North (South) division is composed of 11 clubs.

Canter 
The Canter division is composed of 13 clubs.

East 
The East division is composed of 10 clubs.

West – Group One 
The West Group One division is composed of 16 clubs.

West – Group Two 
The West Group Two division is composed of 15 clubs.

Notes and references

Notes

References

External links
Official website

Serbian Second Regional
2006 establishments in Serbia
Serbia